Darbar Move was the name given to the bi-annual shift of the secretariat and all other government offices of Jammu and Kashmir from one capital city to another. From May to October, governmental offices were housed in the summer capital, Srinagar, and the other six months in its winter capital, Jammu. The tradition was started during the rule of Maharaja Ranbir Singh in 1872. The tradition was continued even after 1952 by State Government of Jammu and Kashmir, as it acted a major bridge space for interaction between the linguistics and diverse cultural groups of Jammu and Kashmir.

In April 2021, for the first time in history Government of Jammu and Kashmir decided to defer the Darbar Move due to COVID-19 pandemic in India.

On 30 June 2021, the 149 years old biannual tradition of shifting capital between Jammu and Srinagar came to an end when the Government  led by Lieutenant Governor Manoj Sinha cancelled the practice and served a notice to the employees working in the civil secretariat to vacate darbar move related accommodation in three weeks. Regarding the discontinuation of the move, on 30 March 2020, former chief secretary B. V. R Subramanyam said that government had  taken concrete steps to switch paperless office by rolling out e_office in the moving departments. The administration has uploaded official records to the e_office. The switch to the online mode will avoid wear and tear as well as loss of official records during the biannual transit, besides saving the associated transportation costs. Government offices will now function at both Jammu and Srinagar.

This productive and efficient move will save money, resources and time, that could be utilised towards the welfare and development of the union territory. These resources can be utilised for the protection and propagation of the culture and heritage of the communities.

References 

Government of Jammu and Kashmir